Detoxification is the physiological or medicinal removal of toxic substances from a living organism, including the human body.

Detoxification, detoxication or detox may also refer to:

Medicine and science
 Alcohol detoxification, medical treatment for alcohol dependence through the abrupt cessation 
 Drug detoxification, any of various treatments for drug abuse or overdose
 Heavy metal detoxification, removal of toxic heavy metals from the body
 Chelation therapy, a form of heavy metal detoxification involving the administration of chelating agents
 Drug metabolism, the process of metabolising and excreting a toxic substance into frp, a biological organism
 Environmental remediation, removal of pollutants from the environment
 Detoxification (alternative medicine), unscientific treatments purported to remove unspecified "toxins" from the body

Technology
 Digital detox is a period of time when an individual refrains from using electronic connecting devices such as smartphones and computers.

Popular culture
 Detox, the working title for Dr. Dre's album Compton 
 Detox (Treble Charger album), a 2002 album by Treble Charger
 "Detox" (song), a 2022 song by American rapper Lil Baby
 "Detox", a 2008 song by Millencolin
 "Detox", a 1997 song by Strapping Young Lad
 "Detox" (House), a 2005 episode of the medical drama House
 Detox Icunt, an American drag queen

See also
 D-Tox, a 2002 American psychological thriller horror film directed by Jim Gillespie and starring Sylvester Stallone.